Yuval Yairi (born 1961 in Tel-Aviv, Israel) is an Israeli artist, using photography and video.
Yairi Studied visual communication at the WIZO College Haifa (1984-1988), was the director of a design studio in Jerusalem (1988-1999), produced and directed short films and documentaries until 2004.
Since 2004 Yairi devotes his work to research and artistic activity, primarily in mediums of photography and video.
The subjects of Yairi's work relate to Places, and his gaze - whether it's a historical place, cultural, personal or political - explores these places in context of memory. A Leper Hospital or a writer's library, an abandoned Arab village, a cheap hotel-room or a museum undergoing renovations - transform through his personal perspective, of deconstructing and recomposing spaces, times and events.
Yairi's works are exhibited in museums, galleries and festivals in Israel and abroad, and are in public and private collections.

Yairi is a recipient of The Ministry of Culture Award for Visual Arts, 2017

Yuval Yairi's series "Forevemore" has been exhibited at the Tel Aviv Museum of Art and Andrea Meislin Gallery in NYC in 2005.

Yairi photographs the leper house with a digital video camera in still mode, constructing the image from hundreds (at times thousands) of frames. The pictures are taken in the course of several hours, during which the artist slowly and accurately documents every detail in the space from a single position, like the viewer's observation movement upon entering the space.
He selects details which he then combines into a final unified photographic image containing a wealth of information,
one that no single still photograph can contain. Thus, in fact, Yairi overcomes the temporal and spatial limitations of conventional photography.
from exhibition text, Tel Aviv Museum.

Yuval Yairi's "Palaces of Memory" series has been exhibited at Alon Segev Gallery in 2007, and in New York at Andrea Meislin Gallery, 2008.

The Cage and the Bird 
"A cage went in search of a bird" wrote Kafka Kafka : a photographic structure went out into the world in search of motifs that would suit it. The result is the heart of this exhibition.
The world can be perceived as "at once," as one, absolute, indivisible thing. But it can also be thought of as the sum of an infinite numbers of parts. So it is with everything, small or large: the world exists both as "one" (the absolute) and as a cumulation of an infinity of units. It is this duality that Yuval Yairi's photographs attempt to capture. They are almost all, at one and the same time, a collection of fractions, and a whole. They represent these two states of being - like water attempting to be vapor and ice at one and the same time. 
The "thickening of time" results from the image of the "art of memory," from which Yairi sets out to make his recent series of photographs, following in the path of Simonides of Ceos (556-468 B.C.E), the Greek poet considered to be the father of mnemonics (the art of aiding memory). Simonides' method of remembering is based on the "translation" of abstract concepts into concrete objects and their imaginary placement in a space well known to the memorizer, based on the assumption that concrete images are easier to remember than abstract ideas.  Thus, for example, a poem can be translated into a series of mnemonic images that can be installed in the home of the memorizer. The act of remembering involves a stroll through the house, and the gathering of visual "reminders" along a known path.
Dror Burstein

Yuval Yairi is represented by Fabienne Levy Gallery in Lausanne, Switzerland

Solo exhibitions 
2019	Cyphers & Cypresses, Fabienne Levy Gallery, Lausanne, CH 
2016	Surveyor, Epsten Gallery, Kansas City, USA
2016	Surveyor, Zemack Contemporary Art, Tel Aviv
2013	LAND, Zemack Contemporary Art, Tel-Aviv
2011	WORK (The Israel Museum's Renewal), Zemack Contemporary Art, Tel-Aviv
2008	Palaces of Memory, Andrea Meislin Gallery, NY
2007	Palaces of Memory, Alon Segev Gallery, Tel-Aviv
2005	Forevermore, Tel Aviv Museum of Art
2005	Forevermore, Andrea Meislin Gallery, New York

Selected group exhibitions 
2017	Dangerous Art, Haifa Museum of Art
2017	Street View, Haifa Museum of Art
2016	Quest, Tel Hai Museum of Photography
2015 	Sanctuary, Orlando Museum of Art
2013	Collecting Dust, Contemporary Israeli Art, The Israel Museum, Jerusalem
2011	Roundabout - Face to Face, Tel-Aviv Museum of Art
2011	Life: A user's Manual, The Israel Museum, Jerusalem
2010	Roundabout, City Gallery Wellington, New Zealand
2010	Looking in, Looking out: The window in art, The Israel Museum, Jerusalem
2008	Israel is Real, Contemporary photography from Israel, Epsten Gallery, Kansas
2008	@60.art.israel.world, Magnes Museum, Berkeley, California
2007	Moods and Modes in Israeli Photography, Tel Aviv Museum of Art
2007	Current Visions part 2, Andrea Meislin Gallery, NY
2006	Laterna Magica, Metaphysical Light in Israeli Photography, Bat-Yam Museum of Art
2004	"New Exposures" Recent acquisitions in Photography, The Israel Museum, Jerusalem

Selected Festivals 
2017	Meetings, Video and Performance Festival, Denmark
2016	Cologne Off, Torrance Art Museum, Los Angeles 
2016	Time is Love, Plateau gallery, Berlin
2015 	Now & After Video art Festival Moscow – guests program
2015	Winter Stream (video art and short films), Epsten Gallery, Kansas City
2014	Video art and experimental film festival, Tribeca Cinemas, NY
2014	Festival of Migrant Films, Ljubljana, Slovenia
2014	FOKUS 2014 video art festival, Copenhagen
2014	AIVA, International video Art festival. Finspång, Sweden

Further reading 
Etty Schwartz,Surveyor’s Room, Surveyor, Zemack Gallery, Tel Aviv, Epsten Gallery, KC,2016 
Ron Bartos, Yuval Yairi: LAND, Zemack Gallery, Tel Aviv, 2013
Ketzia Alon, Yuval Yairi: Work, Zemack Gallery, Tel Aviv, 2011
Dror Burstein, Yuval Yairi: Palaces of Memory, Alon Segev Gallery, Tel Aviv, 2007
Eyal Danieli,  Yuval Yairi: Forevermore, Andrea Meislin Gallery, New York, 2005
Stigmart Videofocus: LAND

References

External links 
http://www.yuvalyairi.com
http://yuvalyairi.wordpress.com/
http://www.zcagallery.com/
http://www.artnet.com/artist/424078088/yuval-yairi.html
http://www.luminous-lint.com/__sw.php?action=ACT_SING_PH&p1=Yuval__Yairi&p2=A
http://www.saatchi-gallery.co.uk/yourgallery/artist_profile//2296.html
Fractions Of Reality: Yuval Yairi Photography works, By Dalia Karpel. https://web.archive.org/web/20070504082556/http://www.jewish-theatre.com:80/visitor/article_display.aspx?articleID=1478

Israeli photographers
Living people
1961 births
Israeli contemporary artists
People from Tel Aviv